Massimo Parziani (born 10 July 1992 in Rovereto) is an Italian Grand Prix motorcycle racer.

Career statistics

By season

Races by year
(key)

References

External links
 Profile on motogp.com

Living people
1992 births
Italian motorcycle racers
125cc World Championship riders
FIM Superstock 1000 Cup riders
People from Rovereto
Sportspeople from Trentino